In enzymology, a kynurenine-oxoglutarate transaminase is an enzyme that catalyzes the chemical reaction

-kynurenine + 2-oxoglutarate  4-(2-aminophenyl)-2,4-dioxobutanoate + -glutamate

Thus, the two substrates of this enzyme are -kynurenine and 2-oxoglutarate, whereas its two products are 4-(2-aminophenyl)-2,4-dioxobutanoate and -glutamate. The former product is an unstable α-oxo acid that quickly undergoes intramolecular cyclization to form kynurenic acid.

This enzyme belongs to the family of transferases, to be specific, the transaminases, that transfer nitrogenous groups.  The systematic name of this enzyme class is -kynurenine:2-oxoglutarate aminotransferase. Other names in common use include kynurenine transaminase (cyclizing), kynurenine 2-oxoglutarate transaminase, kynurenine aminotransferase, and -kynurenine aminotransferase.  This enzyme participates in tryptophan metabolism.  It employs one cofactor, pyridoxal phosphate.

KYAT1, AADAT (aka KYAT2), and KYAT3 are examples of enzymes of this class. GOT2 (aka KYAT4) is also believed to catalyze the above reaction.

Structural studies 

References

Further reading 

 
 
 
  
    
   
 
 
 
 
 

EC 2.6.1
Enzymes of known structure
Pyridoxal phosphate enzymes